Kate Larson may refer to:
Kate Larson (historian), American historian and Harriet Tubman scholar
Kate Larson (computer scientist), Canadian computer scientist
 (1961–2018), Swedish writer

See also
Kate Larsen, fictional character on New Zealand soap opera Shortland Street
Katherine Larson, American poet, molecular biologist and field ecologist